The 587th Bombardment Squadron is an inactive United States Air Force unit that was assigned to the 394th Bombardment Group.  It was a Martin B-26 Marauder unit that was organized and trained in the United States during World War II.  It flew combat missions in the European Theater of Operations, where it earned a Distinguished Unit Citation and a French Croix de Guerre with Palm.  After V-E Day, it served with the occupation forces in Germany until inactivating on 28 December 1945 as the 394th Group converted to Douglas A-26 Invaders.

History

Training in the United States
The 587th Bombardment Squadron was activated at MacDill Field, Florida as one of the original four squadrons of the 394th Bombardment Group. It began to train with the Martin B-26 Marauder, performing most of its training at Kellogg Field, Michigan.  It departed for the European Theater of Operations (ETO) in mid-February 1944.

Combat in Europe
The squadron was established at RAF Boreham, which was to be its station until after D-Day, in mid March, and flew its first combat mission on 23 March, less than two weeks after its arrival in the ETO.  It helped prepare for the invasion of Normandy by participating in Operation Crossbow, striking V-1 flying bomb and V-2 rocket launch sites.  It also carried out attacks on marshalling yards, bridges, gun emplacements and airfields.  Not all targets were near the intended invasion landing areas.  For example, in April, the squadron participated in a heavy attack on the marshalling yard at Mechlen, Belgium.  Later that month, it encountered particularly heavy flak in an attack on Heuringhem, in which the airplane leading the group formation received 264 holes. However, bombing results were not as accurate as desired, and the squadron was removed from operations for a week for additional training.  On D-Day it attacked gun emplacements at Cherbourg, afterwards striking lines of communications, fuel storage sites and enemy strong points.

The squadron moved to RAF Holmsley South on 24 July, in a general move by the units of the 98th Bombardment Wing to bases closer to the invasion area, and on the following day supported Operation Cobra, the breakout at Saint Lo.  Between 7 and 9 August, the squadron made five attacks on strongly defended targets in northern France.  This operation resulted in the award of the Distinguished Unit Citation to the squadron.  Later that month, the squadron moved to its first base on the continent, Tour-en-Bessin Airfield, in France.  From this base, the 587th attacked strong points at Brest, France and later began attacking targets in Germany from its bases on the continent.  During the Battle of the Bulge, the squadron attacked lines of communications to prevent reinforcements from reaching the attacking German forces.  it participated in Operation Clarion, intended to destroy the remaining elements of the German transportation system.  In addition to attacking transportation and storage facilities, toward the end of the war, the squadron dropped propaganda leaflets over occupied territory, which included the squadron's last combat mission.

Occupation and inactivation
Following V-E Day, the squadron moved to Kitzingen Airfield, Germany, where it became part of the Army of Occupation.  In December, the 394th Group began to transition into the Douglas A-26 Invader. However, it also reduced its component squadrons from four to three and the 397th was inactivated in late December 1945.

Lineage
 Constituted as the 587th Bombardment Squadron (Medium) on 15 February 1943
 Activated on 5 March 1943
 Redesignated 587th Bombardment Squadron, Medium on 9 October 1944
 Redesignated 587th Bombardment Squadron, Light on 28 February 1946
 Inactivated on 28 December 1945

Assignments
 394th Bombardment Group, 5 March 1943 – 28 December 1945

Stations

 MacDill Field, Florida, 5 March 1943
 Ardmore Army Air Field, Oklahoma, 12 July 1943
 Kellogg Field, Michigan, 23 August 1943 – 15 February 1944
 RAF Boreham (AAF-161), England, 11 March 1944
 RAF Holmsley South (AAF-455), England, 28 July 1944
 Tour-en-Bessin Airfield (A-13), France, 31 August 1944

 Orleans-Bricy Airfield (A-50), France, 25 September 1944
 Cambrai/Niergnies Airfield (A-74), France, 12 October 1944
 Venlo Airfield (Y-55), Netherlands, 7 May 1945
 AAF Station Kitzingen (R-6), Germany, c. 21 September 1945 – 28 December 1945

Aircraft
 Martin B-26 Marauder, 1943–1945
 Douglas A-26 Invader, 1945

References

Notes
 Explanatory notes

 Citations

Bibliography

 
 
 
 
 
 

Bombardment squadrons of the United States Army Air Forces